WGL may refer to:

 WGL, the original (1927–1928) call sign of the New York City radio station that has since evolved into WADO
 WGL (AM), a radio station (1250 AM) licensed to Fort Wayne, Indiana
 WGL (software) a window management interface for OpenGL on Windows platforms
 WGL-FM, a former (2007-2014) call sign of a radio station (102.9 FM) licensed to Huntington, Indiana, which was changed to WJCI
 WGL Holdings or its subsidiary, the Washington Gas Light Company.
 Windows Glyph List 4